T.Palur block is a revenue block of Ariyalur district of the Indian state of Tamil Nadu. This revenue block consist of 33 panchayat villages.

Panchayat Villages 
They are,

Cricket Teams
TCC- Titans Cricket Club.

RCC - Royal challengers cricket club.

References 

Revenue blocks of Ariyalur district